Emios (an acronym for Environmental Memory Interoperable Open Service) is an MDD / MDE platform that aims to provide a range of services for storing and sharing information about environmental research activities.

History
Emios, initiated by C. Faucher in June 2006, is based on the Environmental Memory concepts developed by the "Motive" CNRS committee and specifically by Franck Guarnieri in 2003.

Emios is a set of Eclipse plugins based on EMF, distributed under the terms of the EPL License.
The current version is the 0.0.1 and mainly contains the Geographic Information Standards Manager: GISM. GISM is the first part of Emios and implements the ISO 19100 series of International Standards from ISO TC211.

Scientific References
Faucher C., Gourmelon F., Lafaye J.Y., Rouan M., "Mise en place d’une mémoire environnementale adaptée aux besoins d’un observatoire du domaine cotier : MEnIr", Revue Internationale de Géomatique, Hermès/Lavoisier, vol 19/1, pp. 7–26, 2009, http://geo.e-revues.com/

Faucher C., Lafaye J.Y., 2007. Model-Driven Engineering for implementing the ISO 19100 series of international standards, "CoastGIS 07, the 8th International Symposium on GIS and Computer Mapping for Coastal Zone Management", vol. 2, p. 424-433, 7–10 October, Santander, Spain.

Related link
Emios web site

Environmental science software
Geographic information systems
Domain-specific programming languages